The Eighth Schedule to the Constitution of India lists the official languages of the Republic of India. At the time when the Constitution was enacted, inclusion in this list meant that the language was entitled to representation on the Official Languages Commission, and that the language would be one of the bases that would be drawn upon to enrich Hindi and English, the official languages of the Union. The list has since, however, acquired further significance. The Government of India is now under an obligation to take measures for the development of these languages, such that "they grow rapidly in richness and become effective means of communicating modern knowledge." In addition, candidates sitting for an examination conducted for public service are entitled to use any of these languages as a medium to answer the paper.

Schedule languages
As per Articles 344(1) and 351 of the Indian Constitution, the eighth schedule includes the recognition of the following 22 languages:

 Assamese
 Bengali
 Bodo
 Dogri
 Gujarati
 Hindi
 Kannada
 Kashmiri
 Konkani
 Maithili
 Malayalam
 Manipuri
 Marathi
 Nepali
 Odia
 Punjabi
 Sanskrit
 Santali
 Sindhi
 Tamil
 Telugu
 Urdu

Chronology
1950: 14 were initially included in the Constitution.
1967: Sindhi was added by 21st Constitutional Amendment Act.
1992: Konkani, Manipuri (Meitei) and Nepali were added by 71st Constitutional Amendment Act
2003: Bodo, Dogri, Maithili and Santali were added by 92nd Constitutional Amendment Act.
2011: The spelling Oriya was replaced by Odia by 96th Constitutional Amendment Act.

Demands for expansion
At present, as per the Ministry of Home Affairs, there are demands for inclusion of 39 more languages
in the Eighth Schedule to the Constitution. These are:

Angika
Awadhi
Banjara
Bajjika
Bhojpuri
Bhoti
Bhotia
Bundelkhandi
Chhattisgarhi
Dhatki
English 
Garhwali
Gondi
Gujjari 
Ho
Kachhi
Kamtapuri
Karbi
Khasi
Kodava
Kokborok
Kumaoni
Kurukh
Kurmali
Lepcha
Limbu
Mizo
Magahi
Mundari
Nagpuri
Nicobarese
Pahari
Pali
Rajasthani
Sambalpuri
Shauraseni Prakrit
Saraiki
Tenyidi
Tulu

Notes

References

Languages of India
8